Bua Football Club also known as Bua Football Association is a semi-professional Fijian football team playing in the second division of the Fiji Football Association competitions. It is based in Bua, which is a province on the western end of the island of Vanua Levu. Their home stadium is Bua Primary School Ground. Their uniform includes orange shirt.

History 
The Bua Association was formed in 1976, under the presidency of Jag Ram.

Current squad
Squad for the 2022 Inter-District Championship

Other players under contract

Youth squad

Personnel

Current technical staff 

 Vikesh Rikneel Prasad

Achievements 
Vodafone Senior League - Vanua Levu Zone: 2
Winner: 2016, 2020, 2021 

Inter-District Championship - Second Division: 3
Winner: 1973, 1977, 2022.
Runner-up: 2020
Fair Play Team: 2020

See also 
 Fiji Football Association
 2020 Vodafone Senior League
 Fiji Senior League

References

Bibliography 
 M. Prasad, Sixty Years of Soccer in Fiji 1938 – 1998: The Official History of the Fiji Football Association, Fiji Football Association, Suva, 1998.

External links 
 facebook.com/buafootball

Football clubs in Fiji
1976 establishments in Fiji